Following is a list of senators of Haute-Vienne, people who have represented the department of Haute-Vienne in the Senate of France.

Third Republic

Senators for Haute-Vienne under the French Third Republic were:

 Pierre Teisserenc de Bort (1876–1892)
 André Dulery de Peyramont (1876–1880)
 Jean-Baptiste Ninard (1880–1886)
 René Pénicaut (1886–1899)
 Jules Donnet (1888–1894)
 Albert Le Play (1892–1900)
 Edmond Teisserenc de Bort (1895–1909)
 Henri Lavertujon (1900–1907)
 André Gotteron (1900–1909)
 Léon Raymond (1907–1920)
 Henri Vacherie (1909–1917)
 Jean Codet (1909–1920)
 Xavier Mazurier (1920–1927)
 René Paul Gustave Trouvé (1920–1927)
 Pierre Codet (1921–1924)
 Léon Betoulle (1924–1940)
 Jean Leclerc (1927–1936)
 Achille Fèvre (1927–1940)
 Eugène Nicolas (1936–1940)

Fourth Republic

Senators for Haute-Vienne under the French Fourth Republic were:

Fifth Republic 
Senators for Haute-Vienne under the French Fifth Republic:

References

Sources

 
Lists of members of the Senate (France) by department